"Big Foot" is an episode of the British comedy television series The Goodies.

The episode is also known as "Bigfoot", "In Search of Bigfoot", "Arthur C. Clarke" and "In Search of Arthur C. Clarke".

This episode was made by LWT for ITV, and was written by The Goodies, with songs and music by Bill Oddie.

Plot
Tim and Bill watch "Part 97" of their favourite show The Mysterious World Of Arthur C. Clarke. A voiceover then informs them that the show has been cancelled due to the non-existence of Arthur C. Clarke.

Cultural references
 Arthur C. Clarke
 Stonehenge
 Loch Ness Monster
 Bigfoot
 Yeti
 UFO
 Patterson–Gimlin film
 The Life and Times of Grizzly Adams
 Plesiosaur

DVD and VHS releases

This episode has been released on both DVD and VHS.

References

 "The Complete Goodies" — Robert Ross, B T Batsford, London, 2000
 "The Goodies Rule OK" — Robert Ross, Carlton Books Ltd, Sydney, 2006
 "From Fringe to Flying Circus — 'Celebrating a Unique Generation of Comedy 1960-1980'" — Roger Wilmut, Eyre Methuen Ltd, 1980
 "The Goodies Episode Summaries" — Brett Allender
 "The Goodies — Fact File" — Matthew K. Sharp

External links
 

The Goodies (series 9) episodes
1982 British television episodes
Television about Bigfoot